The 1912–13 Dartmouth men's ice hockey season was the 8th season of play for the program.

Season
With their fifth coach in as many years, Dartmouth was hoping that they could put the disaster of the previous season behind them. First, however, they would have to get through the imminent collapse of the Intercollegiate Hockey Association, with both Yale and Columbia having withdrawn.

The team opened with a win over MIT, their first in 21 months. They followed that up with a 2–3 loss to Princeton, but after having been embarrassed the year before the result was very encouraging. 

Dartmouth played only one more game the remainder of January and the rust showed in their loss to Harvard. Afterwards, however, the Greens recovered with six consecutive wins over a short span of time. Dartmouth finished with a winning record for the first time in four years and their only losses came against the two best teams in the country.

Note: Dartmouth College did not possess a moniker for its athletic teams until the 1920s, however, the university had adopted 'Dartmouth Green' as its school color in 1866.

Roster

Standings

Schedule and Results

|-
!colspan=12 style=";" | Regular Season

† Mass Ag. only list one game against Dartmouth with the score being 3–5 against. It is possible that the game was combined or split in the record improperly.

References

Dartmouth Big Green men's ice hockey seasons
Dartmouth
Dartmouth
Dartmouth
Dartmouth